The Federation of Independents (VdU) was a German nationalist and national-liberal political party in Austria active from 1949 to 1955. It was the predecessor of the Freedom Party of Austria (FPÖ).

Formation
The party was officially founded on 25 March 1949 by Herbert Kraus and Viktor Reimann.  The party's formation had been encouraged by the Socialist Party of Austria (SPÖ), which sought to split the right-wing vote in the 1949 legislative election in order to weaken the conservative People's Party (ÖVP) and gain a parliamentary majority. On the next day the constituent assembly was held at Salzburg, then in the US occupation zone. Herbert Kraus was elected Chairman (Bundesobmann), while Viktor Reimann, Josef Karoly, Karl Hartleb and Karl Winkler were appointed Vice-Chairmen (Bundesobmann-Stellvertreter). Kraus was party leader until 1952.

VdU saw itself as representing the interests of former members of the Nazi Party, expellees from Central and Eastern Europe, returning prisoners of war and other discontent portions of the Austrian population. Although close to the ÖVP, the party also advocated liberal individualism, and did not concern itself much with the "Catholic question." VdU supported the abolition of denazification laws limiting the political activities of former Nazis.

Electoral success and decline
In the 1949 legislative election the VdU obtained 11.7% of the vote and won 16 seats in the National Council. The SPÖ's strategy of creating a split in the non-Socialist vote failed, with both the SPÖ and the ÖVP losing equally to the VdU. The party drew most of its support in areas where in pre-war times the rural Landbund had been rooted and in cities with a high percentage of former Nazis. At the 1953 legislative election, its share of the vote fell slightly to 10.9% and 14 seats in the National Council.

Beginning soon after its foundation, the party saw the start of heavy internal strife between the more liberal approach of the founders Kraus and Reimann and the German nationalist faction centering on the former Luftwaffe General Gordon Gollob. This led to the collapse of the party, which was absorbed by the newly founded Freedom Party of Austria (FPÖ) of Anton Reinthaller in 1956.

Notable members
 Gordon Gollob
 Friedrich Peter
 Lothar Rendulic

References

1949 establishments in Austria
Defunct political parties in Austria
Defunct liberal political parties in Austria
Freedom Party of Austria
German nationalism in Austria
German nationalist political parties
National liberal parties
Nationalist parties in Austria
Political history of Austria
Political parties disestablished in 1955
Political parties established in 1949
Veterans' organizations
Landsmannschaften
Right-wing parties in Europe